Herman H. Fortmann Building, also known as the Dickmann Store, is a historic commercial building located at Marthasville, Warren County, Missouri.  It was built in 1904, and is a two-story, Late Victorian style frame building on a stone foundation. It features an elaborate pressed metal facade and parapet.

It was listed on the National Register of Historic Places in 2006.

References

Commercial buildings on the National Register of Historic Places in Missouri
Victorian architecture in Missouri
Commercial buildings completed in 1904
Buildings and structures in Warren County, Missouri
National Register of Historic Places in Warren County, Missouri